Anticipate Recordings is an independent record label based in Manhattan founded by electronic music producer and performer Ezekiel Honig. Anticipate combines elements of electro-acoustics, ambient, slow motion techno, and found house with traces of filtered influences ranging from jazz, post rock, classical, dub, musique concrète, and minimalism.

Artists
Ezekiel Honig (United States)
Sebastian Meissner aka Klimek (Germany)
aAron Munson (Canada)
Joshue Ott (United States)
Morgan Packard (United States)
Nicola Ratti (Italy)
Sawako (Japan)
Mark Templeton (Canada)

Catalog
ANT-001   -  Mark Templeton - Standing on a Hummingbird (February 19, 2007)
ANT-002   -  Morgan Packard - Airships Fill the Sky CD + Morgan Packard & Joshue Ott Unsimulatable DVD (July 2, 2007)
ANT-003   -  Sawako - Madoromi (October 15, 2007)
ANT-004   -  Klimek - Dedications (November 12, 2007)
ANT-004A -  Klimek - Dedications Limited Edition EP (November 12, 2007)
ANT-005   -  Nicola Ratti - From the Desert Came Saltwater (May 26, 2008)
ANT-006   -  Ezekiel Honig - Surfaces of a Broken Marching Band (October 27, 2008)
ANT-006A -  Ezekiel Honig - Porchside Past Tense 7" vinyl (December 14, 2008)
ANT-007   -  Mark Templeton - Inland (May 11, 2009)
ANT-007A -  Mark Templeton - Sea Point 12" vinyl (August 17, 2009)
ANT-008   -  Klimek - Movies is Magic (October 12, 2009)
ANT-009   -  Mark Templeton & aAron Munson - Acre Loss CD+DVD (February 2, 2009)

References

External links
 Official site

American independent record labels
Electronic music record labels
Experimental music record labels